Hauschildt is a surname. Notable people with the surname include:

Bodil Hauschildt (1861–1951), Danish photographer
Edgar Hauschildt (1902–1954), German-born Brazilian cinematographer
Steve Hauschildt (born 1984), American electronic musician
Melissa Hauschildt (born 1983), Australian triathlete

See also
Hauschild